The Waterville Public Library is the public library serving Waterville, Maine.

References

External links 
official website
City of Waterville, Maine

Libraries in Kennebec County, Maine
Public libraries in Maine
Buildings and structures in Waterville, Maine
Education in Waterville, Maine
1896 establishments in Maine
Libraries established in 1896